Big Bad... (stylized in all caps) is the fifth studio album by British rapper Giggs. It was released on February 22, 2019 via NO BS Music Limited / Island Records. The album features guest appearances from Gashi, Ghetts, Jadakiss, Kristian Hamilton, Labrinth, Lil Yachty, French Montana, Swizz Beatz, Theophilus London and Wretch 32. The album debuts at number 6 in the UK Albums Chart.

Promotion

Part 2 of The Essence was released on 20 December 2019 and was inspired by the soundtrack of the soundtrack of Big Bad....

Track listing

Charts

References

External links 

2019 albums
Giggs (rapper) albums
Island Records albums
Albums produced by DJ Paul
Albums produced by Jahlil Beats
Albums produced by Labrinth
Albums produced by Swizz Beatz